The 2022 Cork Junior A Hurling Championship was the 125th staging of the Cork Junior A Hurling Championship since its establishment by the Cork County Board in 1895. The championship ran from 29 October to 4 December 2022.

The final replay was played on 4 December 2022 at Páirc Uí Rinn in Cork, between Erin's Own and Kilshannig, in what was their first ever meeting in the final. Erin's Own won the match by 1-30 to 3-20 to claim their first ever championship title overall and a first title.

Qualification 

== Divisional Championships ==

Duhallow Junior A Hurling Championship 
Group 1

Banteer 3-15 - 0-19 Millstreet

Kanturk 3-09 - 3-33 Dromtarriffe

Banteer 5-16 - 2-15 Kanturk

Dromtarriffe 0-26 - 0-14 Banteer

Group 2

Newmarket 3-19 - 0-09 Castlemagner

Newmarket 0-19 - 1-17 Kilbrin

Kilbrin 0-21 - 1-09 Castlemagner

Knockout Stage

North Cork Junior A Hurling Championship 
Group A

Group B

Group C

Group D

Knockout Stage

South West Junior A Hurling Championship 
Group 1

Group 2

Group 3

Knockout Stage

City Junior A Hurling Championship 
First Round

Na Piarsaigh 1-12 - 2-23 Whitechurch

Nemo Rangers 1-18 - 1-05 Bishopstown

St Finbarrs 0-18 - 2-33 St Vincents

Glen Rovers 0-18 - 0-12 Whites Cross

Blackrock 2-11 - 3-25 Passage

Second Round

Brian Dillons 3-22 - 1-08 Blackrock

Na Piarsaigh 4-22 - 1-11 St Finbarrs

Bishopstown 0-12 - 0-06 Whites Cross

Quarter-Finals

Glen Rovers 0-17 - 3-15 Nemo Rangers

Bishopstown 1-12 - 2-22 Whitechurch

St Vincents 0-13 - 1-22 Brian Dillons

Passage 2-18 - 0-06 Na Piarsaigh

Semi-Finals

Passage 4-08 - 2-23 Brian Dillons

Whitechurch 2-06 - 1-14 Nemo Rangers

Final

Brian Dillons 1-06 - 0-13 Nemo Rangers

South East Junior A Hurling Championship 
Group 1

Group 2

Group 3

Knockout Stage

East Cork Junior A Football Championship 
Group A

Group B

Knockout StageRelegation Playoff

 Watergrasshill 2-22 - 3-11  Carrigtwohill

Fixtures and results

Bracket

Quarter-finals

 Ballinora received a bye in this round.

Semi-finals

Final

References

External link 

 Cork GAA website

2022 in Irish sport
Cork Junior A Hurling Championship